Hans Schabus (born 25 January 1970) is an Austrian visual artist known primarily for his site-specific installations.

Biography
In 2002 Schabus exhibited a video piece in which he navigated the sewage canals of Vienna in a rowboat at Manifesta 4 in Frankfurt.

In 2007 he had his first solo museum exhibition in the United States at SITE Santa Fe in Santa Fe, New Mexico "Deserted Conquest".

In representing Austria at the 2005 Venice Biennale, Schabus transformed the Austrian pavilion into a massive artificial mountain, while investigating  preexisting concepts pertaining to nature, culture, and the role

References

1970 births
Austrian artists
Austrian contemporary artists
Living people